Mehdi Fawzi Mahmoud Alamah is a Jordanian footballer who plays as a midfielder for Iraqi club Al-Minaa and the Jordan national football team.

Club career
On 23 July 2014, Alamah joined Al-Faisaly from Al-Jazeera.

International career
Mehdi's first match with the Jordan national team was against Lebanon in the 2014 WAFF Championship on 26 December 2013, in Doha, which resulted in a 0–0 draw.

Career statistics

International

References

External links 
 
 

1991 births
Living people
People from Irbid
Jordanian footballers
Association football midfielders
Al-Jazeera (Jordan) players
Al-Faisaly SC players
Ma'an SC players
Al-Mina'a SC players
Jordanian Pro League players
Iraqi Premier League players
Jordan international footballers
Jordanian expatriate footballers
Jordanian expatriate sportspeople in Iraq
Expatriate footballers in Iraq